Jogendra Nath Sen (1887 – 22 May 1916) was an Indian private soldier in the British Army who fought in the First World War. He is believed to be the first Bengali soldier to have died in the First World War.

Early life 
Sen was born in Chandernagore, a French colony in Bengal. His mother was a widow and his elder brother was a doctor. Sen travelled to England in 1910. He took admission in the University of Leeds. During his studies he took up a job in Leeds Corporation Electric Lighting station in Whitehall Road. Sen completed his B.Sc. in Electrical Engineering in 1913. He could speak seven languages.

Career 
After completing his studies, Sen was staying in Grosvenor Place in Blackman Lane in Leeds. In September, 1914, he enlisted in the 15th West Yorkshire Regiment also known as the Leeds Pals Battalion. Sen was the only non-white in the 15th West Yorkshire Regiment. Sen was very much respected by his peers in the army. He was called as Jon Sen or John Sen.

Death 
On the night of 22 May, Sen was in action as the member of a wiring party that was heavily bombarded. Sen was hit in the leg by a shrapnel. When he was being dressed up, he was hit again in the neck and he died instantly. He was buried at the Sucrerie Military Cemetery in Colincamps in Somme, France. His personal items were sent to his brother in India who later donated them to the Institut de Chandernagore in Chandannagar.

See also 
 Indra Lal Roy

References 

1887 births
1916 deaths
Bengali Hindus
Alumni of the University of Leeds
People from Hooghly district
British India emigrants to the United Kingdom
British Army personnel of World War I
West Yorkshire Regiment soldiers
British military personnel killed in World War I